Ushachy District is a second-level administrative subdivision (raion) of Belarus in the Vitebsk Region.

Notable residents 
 Ryhor Baradulin (1935, Verasoǔka village – 2014), Belarusian poet, essayist and translator
 Vasíl Býkaŭ (1924, Byčki village – 2003), prominent Belarusian writer
 Chaim Zhitlowsky (1865, Ushachy – 1943), Jewish philosopher, writer, and Yiddishist

References

 
Districts of Vitebsk Region